Government College, Rhenock, Pakyong district, Sikkim (GCR) is affiliated to Sikkim University. The college caters to the educational needs of students from the nearby areas of Rhenock, such as Rongli, Chujachen, Aritar, Rorathang, Tareythang, Pakyong, Pacheykhani, Mamring, Reshi and Rangpo, and also to the students from other districts of Sikkim as well as neighbouring towns of Kalimpong district of West Bengal.  The Government College, Rhenock came into existence in the year 2005 and the college was established by the Government of Sikkim.

Courses offered
Government College, Rhenock offers the Bachelor of Arts honours and general in the following subjects:
Bachelor of Arts (honours) in
Sociology
Geography
Bachelor of Arts (general) in
Sociology
Environmental science
Economics
Political science
Education
Geography
History
Nepali
English
Bachelor of Science
Math
Bachelors of Commerce

Government College, Rhenock also offers spoken English course to the students to help them to improve their English language skills.

Compulsory subjects
In the Bachelor of Arts course, which is spread over three years, English is offered as compulsory subject in the first semester, MIL is offered as compulsory subject in second semester, environmental studies is offered as compulsory subject in third semester, Eastern Himalayan Studies- 1 and 2 respectively as compulsory subjects in the fourth and fifth semester.

Eligibility requirements and admission procedure
For B.A (honors) and science admission, candidates must have secured 50% of marks in the subject opted at honors degree and 50% of marks in aggregate in their higher secondary examination. For the general course, candidates must have cleared their class 12 examination from either WBCHSE/CBSE/ISC/SSC. Admissions of students to these courses are done purely on merit basis based on the scores of qualifying examination.

Activities
Government College, Rhenock encourages its students to participate in the activities conducted by the following societies functioning under it:
• Gender Sensitization Cell
• English Literacy Society
• English Debating Society
These societies were established with the objective of offering knowledge to the students about the activities taking place in the society. In addition, students are also made to participate in the national, state-level and local activities like sports, blood donation camps, NSS camps, plantation drives, etc...

Facilities
The college's infrastructure is well furnished with all modern facilities.
Laboratory facilities
Library
Classroom facilities

References

Colleges in India
Universities and colleges in Sikkim
Colleges affiliated to Sikkim University
Pakyong district
Educational institutions established in 2005
2005 establishments in Sikkim